Julia Messenger is an Australian singer-songwriter and producer best known for her work in the electronica, chill-out and jazz genres, being dubbed the “Queen Of Chill” as well as her jazz performances being described as something she “superbly masters.”

She has performed, recorded and collaborated with such notable musical figures including Klaus Schulze, Henning Schmitz, Ferry Corsten, Klaus Waldeck, Manfred Leuchter and Scott Rockenfield.

Career
As an artist, Messenger has released three albums, with songs from those albums appearing on several compilation albums, including Pure Chill Out (2002) which debuted at No. 19 on the U.S. Billboard Top Electronic Albums Chart.

Messenger's songs have also had television placements in ABC's Miss South Sudan Australia, Bad Girls Club, and Thomas Banks: Quest for Love.

In 2006 The New York Times’ listed Messengers' song “Look Up, Look Down” as being included on the Top 5 playlists of songs heard in U.S. Restaurants.

Messenger has performed at many notable Australian venues, including: Bennetts Lane Jazz Club, Melbourne Recital Centre, Montsalvat, Paris Cat Jazz Club, The Vanguard and The Basement.

Messenger has performed internationally throughout Europe and Asia, including significant performances at the Edinburgh Fringe Festival, Alexis Bistro Ampang in Malaysia, Burg Wilhelmstein with Manfred Leuchter, and on the Midnight Sun Train across Finland with Iiro Rantala.

Messenger has performed as a session singer, most notably for artists Manfred Leuchter and Geoff Kluke and the Changes.

As a producer, Messenger remixed Australian band, Not Drowning, Waving’s song “Palau” for the Sonic Maps EP.

Messenger's works “Myamisumi,” “Glitter” “Lover Come Back” and “Stripped” have been remixed by notable producers Razoof, Rubbasol, Salz, Mod X, Charly H. Fox, Raubrec Team, Chris B, Peter Haze, and The Icons South Beach.

Ferry Corsten released a remix album of Twice in a Blue Moon, including the track co-written by Messenger, Black Velvet which was remixed by DJ Mind & Jerry Ropero.

Leading German electronic music magazine, GROOVE has written about and reviewed Salz's remix of Messenger's “Myamisumi” and “Lover Come Back” as well as her collaborations with Whirlpool Productions and Marcus Worgull. Groove commented that “Julia sings into your heart and mine, truthfully so lovingly it rivals that of singer Nicolette.”

Sue Wilson of The Scotsman has written of Messenger's vocal talent: "…through the full spectrum, from fragile candied sweetness to a scorching soul-diva holler – echos of Mouth Music, Annie Lennox, Horse, Sinéad O'Connor…".

Messenger is also featured and interviewed in the book "A Singers Companion: Personal Wisdom from the Global Music Industry" by Australian singer Christine Sullivan and Monika Roleff, sharing experiences and guidance as an international musician.

Collaborations with Klaus Schulze 
As vocalist and composer, Messenger has collaborated on many works with Klaus Schulze, a prominent German composer and musician who has been described as an electronic music pioneer. The significance of her collaborations with Schulze are widely acknowledged and referenced in reviews internationally.

Klaus Schulze released limited box set editions of non-album material, of which Messenger collaborated on Contemporary Works I as a composer and featured vocalist, and Contemporary Works II as a featured vocalist.

Greg Allen's book, “Klaus Schulze, Electronic Music Legend,” features Messenger as a prominent musician and collaborator of Schulze, writing about her compositions and performances as well as interviewing her regarding “The Crime of Suspense” of which she co-wrote two compositions and was featured as a vocalist. Allen comments on her performance of "Overchill" stating, "Julia Messenger and Thomas and Kagermann are both very creative and spirited musicians... adding a stunning new dimension to Klaus’s music." In writing about the title "My Ty She" Allen states, "The combination of your (Thomas Kagermann) ethereal vocals with Julia‘s makes it an extraordinary work."

Messenger's collaborations with Schulze's from Contemporary Works I and Contemporary Works II were re-released as independent albums under different record labels.

Messenger also collaborated as a composer of “KS/Jay M.D” from Essential Edits Promo (2000) and performed as a vocalist on Shadowlands (2013), alongside Lisa Gerrard and Crysta Bell.

Awards 
In 2003, Messenger's songs “Do I Know You” and “Fresh On The Edge” were finalists in the Dance/Electronica category of the Australian Songwriters Association National Songwriting Contest. “Fresh On The Edge” was further recognised in the Top 10 finalists for the category.

In 2007, Messenger was a semi-finalist of the International Songwriting Competition in the AAA (Adult Album Alternative) category for "And We Danced” and in the Performance category for "So Complicated.” In 2016, Messenger was a finalist in EDM (Electronic Dance Music) category with her song “Stripped,” which was later awarded an Honourable Mention.

Artist Discography

Songwriting Discography 
Messenger has had multiple cuts with artists ranging from Whirlpool Productions to Ferry Corsten, regularly performing as a vocalist on the recordings and being credited as a featured artist.

Selected Compilation Discography 
Messenger's songs have been included on many compilation albums released under U.S. and European labels.

Her song "For the Love of You" released with PFL also appeared on a compilation DVD entitled, Flowmotion (Visual Pleasure Volume 3.0) released by General Electric Music.

External links
 http://www.juliamessenger.com

References

Australian singer-songwriters
Living people
Year of birth missing (living people)